The 1937–38 Indiana Hoosiers men's basketball team represented Indiana University. Their head coach was Everett Dean, who was in his 14th and final year. The team played its home games in The Fieldhouse in Bloomington, Indiana, and was a member of the Big Ten Conference.

The Hoosiers finished the regular season with an overall record of 10–10 and a conference record of 4–8, finishing 8th in the Big Ten Conference.

Roster

Schedule/Results

|-
!colspan=8| Regular Season
|-

References

Indiana
Indiana Hoosiers men's basketball seasons
1937 in sports in Indiana
1938 in sports in Indiana